The Planetary Science Decadal Survey is a serial publication of the United States National Research Council produced for NASA and other United States Government Agencies such as the National Science Foundation. The documents identify key questions facing planetary science and outlines recommendations for space and ground-based exploration ten years into the future. Missions to gather data to answer these big questions are described and prioritized, where appropriate. Similar decadal surveys cover astronomy and astrophysics, earth science, and heliophysics.

As of 2022 there have been three "Decadals", one published in 2002 for the decade from 2003 to 2013, one in 2011 for 2013 to 2022, and one in 2022 for 2023 to 2032. The survey for 2023 to 2032 was released on April 19th, 2022.

Before the decadal surveys 

 Planetary Exploration, 1968-1975, published in 1968, recommended missions to Jupiter, Mars, Venus, and Mercury in that order of priority.
 Report of Space Science, 1975 recommended exploration of the outer planets.
 Strategy for Exploration of the Inner Planets, 1977–1987 was published in 1977.
 Strategy for the Exploration of Primitive Solar-System Bodies--Asteroids, Comets, and Meteoroids, 1980–1990 was published in 1980.
 A Strategy for Exploration of the Outer Planets, 1986-1996 was published in 1986.
 Space Science in the Twenty-First Century – Imperatives for the Decades 1995 to 2015, published in 1988, recommended a focus on "Galileo-like missions to study Saturn, Uranus and Neptune" including a mission to rendezvous with Saturn's rings and study of Titan.  It also recommended study of the moon with a "Lunar Geoscience Orbiter", a network of lunar rovers and sample return from the lunar surface.  The report recommended a Mercury Orbiter to study not only that planet but provide some solar study as well.  A "Program of Extensive Study of Mars" beginning with the Mars Pathfinder mission was planned for 1995 to be followed up by one in 1998 to return samples to Earth for study.  Study of primitive bodies such a comet or asteroid was recommended as a flyby mission of Apollo and Amor asteroid.

2003–2013, New Frontiers in the Solar System 

New Frontiers in the Solar System: An Integrated  Exploration Strategy, published in 2003, mapped out a plan for the decade from 2003 to 2013. The committee producing the survey was led by Michael J. Belton.  Five panels focused on the inner planets, Mars, the giant planets, large satellites and astrobiology.  The survey placed heavy emphasis on Mars exploration including the Mars Exploration Rovers, established the New Frontiers program including New Horizons mission to study Pluto and established programs in power and propulsion to lay a technological basis for programs in later decades including crewed missions beyond Earth orbit.

The paper suggested that NASA should prioritize the following missions:

Medium-class missions 

Primitive bodies:
 Kuiper Belt-Pluto Explorer
 Comet Surface Sample Return
 Trojan Asteroid/Centaur Reconnaissance 
 Asteroid Lander/Rover/Sample Return
 Triton/Neptune Flyby
Inner planets:
 Venus In-Situ Explorer (VISE)
 South Pole-Aitken Basin Sample Return 
Mars:
 Mars Long-Lived Lander Network
 Mars Upper Atmosphere Orbiter
 Mars Science Laboratory
Giant planets:
 Jupiter Polar Orbiter with Probes (JPOP)
Large satellites:
 Io Observer
 Ganymede Orbiter
 Neptune flyby

Large-class missions 

Primitive bodies:
 Comet Cryogenic Sample Return
Mars:
 Mars Sample Return
Outer planets:
 Neptune Orbiter with Probes
Large satellites:
 Europa Geophysical Explorer
 Europa Pathfinder Lander
 Europa Astrobiological Lander
 Titan Explorer
 Uranus Orbiter
 Neptune Orbiter

2013–2022, Visions and Voyages for Planetary Science
Visions and Voyages for Planetary Science in the Decade 2013 – 2022 (2011) was published in prepublication form on March 7, 2011, and in final form later that year. Draft versions of the document were presented at town hall meetings around the country, at lunar and planetary conferences, and made available publicly on the NASA website and via the National Academies Press. The report differed from previous reports in that it included a "brutally honest" budgetary review from a 3rd party contractor.

Flagship missions 
The report highlighted a new Mars rover, a mission to Jupiter's moon Europa, and a mission to Uranus and its moons as proposed Flagship Missions. The Mars mission was given highest priority, followed by the Europa mission.

The Mars rover proposal was called MAX-C and it would store samples for eventual return to Earth, but the method of return was left open. It only recommended the rover mission if it could be done cheaply enough (US$2.5 billion).

Studies 
The committee producing the survey was led by Steve Squyres of Cornell University and included 5 panels focusing on the inner planets (Mercury, Venus, and the Moon), Mars (not including Phobos and Deimos), the gas giant planets, satellites (Galilean satellites, Titan, and other satellites of the giant planets) and primitive bodies  (Asteroids, comets, Phobos, Deimos, Pluto/Charon and other Kuiper belt objects, meteorites, and interplanetary dust). 

Mission & Technology Studies:

Mercury Lander Mission Concept Study
Venus Mobile Explorer Mission Concept Study
Venus Intrepid Tessera Lander Concept Study
Venus Climate Mission Concept Study
Lunar Geophysical Network Concept Study
Lunar Polar Volatiles Explorer Mission Concept Study
Near Earth Asteroid Trajectory Opportunities in 2020–2024
Mars 2018 MAX-C Caching Rover Concept Study  
Mars Sample Return Orbiter Mission Concept Study
Mars Sample Return Lander Mission Concept Study
Mars 2018 Sky Crane Capability Study
Mars Geophysical Network Options
Mars Geophysical Network Concept Study
Mars Polar Climate Concepts
Jupiter Europa Orbiter (component of EJSM) Concept Study 
Io Observer Concept Study
Ganymede Orbiter Concept Study
Trojan Tour Concept Study
Titan Saturn System Mission
Saturn Atmospheric Entry Probe Trade Study
Saturn Atmospheric Entry Probe Mission Concept Study
Saturn Ring Observer Concept Study
Enceladus Flyby & Sample Return Concept Studies
Enceladus Orbiter Concept Study
Titan Lake Probe Concept Study
Chiron Orbiter Mission Concept Study
Uranus and Neptune Orbiter and Probe Concept Studies
Neptune-Triton-Kuiper Belt Objects Mission Concept Study
Comet Surface Sample Return Mission Concept Study
Cryogenic Comet Nucleus Sample Return Mission Technology Study
Small Fission Power System Feasibility Study

The recommendation for the New Frontiers program was a selection from one of Comet Surface Sample Return, Lunar South Pole-Aitken Basin Sample Return, Saturn Probe, Trojan Tour and Rendezvous, and Venus In Situ Explorer. Then another selection adding Io Observer, Lunar Geophysical Network. (for NF 4 and 5) In the 2011 response from NASA to the review, NASA supported the New Frontiers recommendations. (The first three New Frontiers missions include New Horizons to Pluto flyby, the Juno Jupiter orbiter, and the OSIRIS-REx near-Earth orbit sample return mission.)

2023–2032, Origins, Worlds, and Life 

Origins, Worlds, and Life: A Decadal Strategy for Planetary Science and Astrobiology 2023-2032 (2022) was published on April 19, 2022.

Flagship Missions 
The report recommended the Uranus Orbiter and Probe as the highest priority Flagship Mission, and also recommended the Enceladus Orbilander and recommended continuing the ongoing Mars Sample Return program.

New Frontiers Program 
The report recommended several different possible mission concepts for the sixth New Frontiers mission:

 Centaur orbiter and lander
 Ceres sample return
 Comet surface sample return
 Enceladus multiple flyby
 Lunar Geophysical Network
 Saturn probe
 Titan orbiter
 Venus In Situ Explorer

See also 
 Astronomy and Astrophysics Decadal Survey
 Earth Science Decadal Survey

References

External links
 Official website
 Previous Space Studies Board reports

Planetary science
Decadal science surveys